The School of Clinical Medicine is the medical school of the University of Cambridge in England. According to the QS World University Rankings 2020, it ranks as the 3rd best medical school in the world. The school is located alongside Addenbrooke's Hospital and other institutions in multiple buildings across the Cambridge Biomedical Campus.

The Clinical School
Students from the University of Cambridge typically enter the clinical school on completion of three years of pre-clinical training.

The Clinical School was established in 1976 while construction of the new building at its present site was underway. The clinical course was restructured in 2005 with the addition of a new final year, as the clinical course had previously been less than three years in length. Before 2017, approximately half of medical students left Cambridge after the pre-clinical course as there were not enough places on the clinical course for them all; common destinations included medical schools based in Oxford, London and Manchester. From 2017, all medical students continue to study in Cambridge for the full six years provided they pass the pre-clinical component of the course. 

Students at the School take either a six-year standard course or an accelerated graduate course. Around 280 students are accepted to the standard course each year (with 21 places for overseas fee-status applicants). Around 40 students are accepted to the graduate course each year.

Entry
Students enter the clinical course at Cambridge following satisfactory progression during the pre-clinical component of the combined medical course or as part of the graduate course.

Departments
 Clinical Biochemistry
 Clinical Neurosciences
 Cambridge Centre for Brain Repair
Neurology Unit
 Neurosurgery
 Wolfson Brain Imaging Centre
 Haematology
 Transfusion Medicine
 Diagnostics Development Unit
 Medical Genetics
 Medicine
 Anaesthesia
 Clinical Pharmacology
Obstetrics and Gynaecology
 Oncology
 Paediatrics
 Brain Mapping Unit
 Development Psychiatry
 Public Health and Primary Care
 The Primary Care Unit
 Clinical Gerontology
Radiology
 Surgery
 Orthopaedic Research

Institutes
 MRC Cancer Unit
 Institute of Metabolic Science (IMS-MRL)
 Cambridge Institute for Medical Research (CIMR)
 Institute of Public Health
 Cancer Research UK Cambridge Institute
 MRC Mitochondrial Biology Unit

Herchel Smith Laboratory for Medicinal Chemistry
The Herchel Smith Laboratory for Medicinal Chemistry is a laboratory under the aegis of the Regius Professor of Physic in the School of Clinical Medicine.

Notable academics
The Regius Professorship of Physic is based at the School of Clinical Medicine. It is currently held by Patrick Maxwell.

Other current academics:
 Kay-Tee Khaw, Professor of Clinical Gerontology

Former academics:

 Ieuan Hughes, Professor Emeritus of Paediatrics

See also
Cambridge Biomedical Campus
Addenbrooke's Hospital

References 

 
Medical schools in England
University and college laboratories in the United Kingdom
Medical research institutes in the United Kingdom